Usim or USIM may refer to:

Universiti Sains Islam Malaysia,  public university in Malaysia
Universal Subscriber Identity Module, a software application for UMTS mobile telephony, which runs on a UICC which is inserted in a 3G mobile phone 
Nduka Usim (born 1985), Azerbaijani footballer